Erika Petunovienė (born Erica Aytė in Vilnius, Lithuania on 3 March 1983), is a contemporary painter.

Biography 
Erika Petunovienė (Erica AYTE), studied at Lithuanian University of Educational Sciences in Lithuania, at the Institute of Culture and Art Education, where obtained the Bachelor and Master degrees of Arts and Technology. Lives and creates in Vilnius.

Style 
Her art represents the abstract symbolist style.

Art 
Plenty of her solo and group exhibitions were held in Germany, Australia, India, Sweden, Austria, Italy etc. Erica Ayte participated in plain-airs and art symposiums in different countries. She was selected and organized solo exhibitions in Lithuanian governmental organizations: Parliament of the Republic of Lithuania, Ministry of National Defense Republic of Lithuania, National Commission for Culture Heritage. In 2019 she represented Lithuania at 12th Florence Biennale, Italy. She received a diploma in the painting competition "Next art week Greece", and won the „Avant-garde art“ title. 
She was invited and a series of her paintings were given as a prize in the charity Golf tournament 3RD Czeslaw Okinczyc Golf Cup 2019, (proceeds were donated to the Children’s Oncology Center) and in the charity auction “Youth Line”. 5 paintings were donated to support the employment center of the Lithuanian Samaritan community “Seniors Hive”.
Solo exhibitions:
 "COLORS ON" – 2019, Aidas gallery, Vilnius;
 "COLOR STORIES" – 2019, International school of law and business, Vilnius;
 "LAZDYNAI: HARMONY OF THE CITY AND NATURE" – 2019, Parliament of the Republic of Lithuania, Vilnius;
 "PLAY-SES" – 2019, Business centre Vertas, Vilnius;
 "GLOW" – 2019, Ministry of National Defence Republic of Lithuania;
 "THE BIRTH OF THE WORLD" – 2018 – 2019, Public Library V. Kudirka, Šilainiai, Kaunas;
 "DeTALE‘S" – 2018, The Wroblewski Library of the Lithuanian Academy of Sciences, Vilnius;
 "FROM LITHUANIA" – 2018, culture week, Maritastextil & Interior, Skara, Sweden;
 "COLORAMA" – Business centre VERTAS, Vilnius, Lithuania;
 "COLORS MUSIC" – 2018, MUSIC GALLERY, Vilnius;
 "IMPRESS & EXPRESS" – 2018 – 2019, Art centre Karolina, Vilnius.

Group exhibitions 
 "ALTERNATIVES 33" – 2019, Gallery 33, Poland.
 "Kaišiadoriai in the eyes of the artist, Žiežmariai" – Ukmergės, Kaišiadoriai cultural center;
 "ARTBOX.PROJECT. MIAMI" Art basel artweeks – 2019, Miami, United States; 
 "THE 35 ASROPA INTERNATIONAL ART EXHIBITION" – 2019, Gunsan Modern History Museum and Gunsan Saemangeum Convention Center, Gunsan, South Korea;
 "ARTBOX.PROJECT. ZÜRICH" – 2019, Zürich, Switzerland; 
 "BODY AS A LANGUAGE" – Bougie art gallery, Canada;
 "IRPINIA 2019" – 2019, Cilento, Italy; 
 "DIMENSION 4" – 2018, Rara the art house, Delhi, India;
 "FEMME FATALE" – 2018, Graz, Austria;
 "Wake up screaming"– "#10:In My Town", 2018, England;
 Presentation of paintings – „ARVY‘S GALLERY“, 2018 – 2019, Australia;
 Presentation of paintings "ART TASTING" – 2018, AP Gallery, Lithuania;
 "ART WALL" – 2018, Graz, Austria;
 "ART STAGES 2018" – Breisgau, Germany;
 "POSITIONEN ZEITGENӦSSISCHER MALEREI IV" – 2018, Berlin, Germany;
 "OPPORTUNITY OF COLORS" – 2006, Vilnius, Santaros high school;
 "TOWN" exhibition – Vilnius Children and Youth Art Gallery.

Biennales 
 12-th FLORENCE BIENALLE (2019-10-18 – 2019-10-27), Florence, Italy;

Exhibitions / competitions 
 "NEXT ART WEEK IN GREECE" – 2019, Myro gallery, Thessaloniki, Greece; 
 "3-RD ALYTUS TOWN INTERNATIONAL YOUNG BIENNALE: ART CODE: LT100" – 2018, Town theatre gallery, Alytus, Lithuania;
 "REBIRTH" – 2018, Public Library and Cultural Centre "Girstutis", Kaunas, Lithuania;

Symposiums and pleinairs 
 International pleinair "Kaišiadorys land in the eyes of an artist", 2019, Kaišiadorys;
 International art symposium "BLUE DOG" – 2019, Raseiniai, Lithuania;
 "ART AND NATURE" international art symposium – 2019, Irpinia, Avellino, Italy;
 "10th INTERNATIONAL ART MEET. DIMENSION 4" – 2018, Pilani, Rajasthan, India.

Events, creative workshops 
 Organizer and exhibition curator of "LAZDYNU CREATIVE ART SPACE", 2019;
 Project organizer of the workshop "Colors of Underground Passage" on the occasion of the 50th anniversary of Lazdynai, 2019.

Diplomas 
 Acknowledgment diploma from Vilnius City Municipality, Lazdynai eldership for organizing "Lazdynai Creators Space" and curating the exhibition;
 Acknowledgment diploma from the Association of Consolation for the kindness and support with artwork at their charity event;
 "NEXT ART WEEK IN GREECE", Myro gallery, Greece, diploma for "Avangard" nomination.

References

Sources 
Art WORK, Kunst and Design, 2018-02
Art WORK, Kunst and Design, about Exhibition ART STAGES, 2018-03
dailininkei-erikai-petunovienei/ Interview, 2018-04, LT life
grozis/170950 Austėja Mikuckytė- Mateikienė „Art by Erika Petunovienė. Not banal goodness and beauty”; 2018-07-21, Bernardinai
A. Mikuckytė- Mateikienė „Alytaus biennial. Young professionals“, 2018-07-11, Bernardinai 
A. Mikuckytė- Mateikienė, „Erikos Petunovienės look at the M.K. Čiurlionis art by her brushes“,  2018-08,  Čiurlionio fondas
Exhibition of painter Erika Petunovienė “Color Music“, 2018-09 Music gallery 
Gabrielė Kuizinaitė, Gytis Oržikauskas „Artist Erika Petunovienės exhibition: art and music synergy in paintings“, 2018-10, Culture bridges 
Erikos Petunovienės personal exhibition „deTALES“, 2018-10, Mokslo Lietuva
Gytis Oržikauskas „Erikos Petunovienės personal exhibition „deTALES“, 2018-11-02, magazine 7  MD/ 7 ART DAYS, No. 35 (1272)
G. Oržikauskas „Tales in the language of abstract symbolism“ 2018-11, Krašto naujienos 
G. Oržikauskas „Tales in the language of abstract symbolism“ 2018-11, Etaplius    
 Magazine „Lietuvė“ No.2/2018; (introduction of the artworks)
 India newspaper, interview and about art symposium, 2018-11-18.
 Vilma Kilinskienė „The birth of the world by Erika Petunoviene“, 2018-12-03, Alkas
 Art introduction
 Gytis Oržikauskas, "Unable to paint without telling story" 2019-02-28, SWO magazine 
 nepapasakojusistorijos/ Gytis Oržikauskas, "Unable to paint without telling story" 2019-02-28, Alkas 
 istorijos/ „Let's stop being afraid of colors“ 2019-03-03, Mėlynas šuo
 Gytis Oržikauskas „Women's touch: Erika Petunovienė- Aytė's paintings“, Culture magazine „Pašvaistė“ 2019/ No. 2, 35–38 psl.
 Bougie Art Gallery Magazine, June 2019, Issue 1.
 Exhibition and symposium: Art and nature“, 2019-06-04, Nuova Irpinia, Italy
 Exhibition „Lazdynai: Harmony of the City and Nature“, Respublika, 2019-06-01
 Exhibition „Lazdynai: Harmony of the City and Nature“, ELTA, 2019-06-01
 The exhibition annotation of the artist Erika Petunovienė “Lazdynai: Harmony of the City and Nature” will be presented in the Lithuanian Parliament in 2019. June 27 Press Releases Lithuanian Parliament
 G. Oržikauskas, Exhibition review “Lazdynai: Harmony of the City and Nature” 2019-07-03
 Exhibition review “Lazdynai: Harmony of the City and Nature” 2019-07-03
 J. Ranceviene,  Creative Festival "DPoetry Source 2019", Symposium "Blue Dog" and Participants, July 17, 2019, 2019-08-04
 J. Ranceviene,  Creative Festival "DPoetry Source 2019", Symposium "Blue Dog" and Participants, July 17, 2019, 2019-08-04, 15 min.lt
 . Ranceviene,  Creative Festival "DPoetry Source 2019", Symposium "Blue Dog" and Participants, July 17, 2019, 2019-08-04, 15 min.lt
 G. Oržikauskas „Dichotomy of Tradition and Innovation” Exhibition Review “COLORS ON”, 2019-08-04, Krašto naujienos
 Artist Erika Petunovienė: "My Family Says I'm Born with Pencils in Hands", “PEOPLE” Magazine 2019-10-03
 About participating in the youth line auction, 2019-10-08, Lrytas
 About participating in the youth line auction, 2019-10-08, 15 min.lt
 Erika Petunovienė's idea of femininity at the Florence Biennale, 2019-11-10, Krašto žinios.lt

Lithuanian painters
Living people
Lithuanian women artists
Contemporary painters
21st-century Lithuanian women
1983 births
Lithuanian University of Educational Sciences alumni